Lake Placid Airport  is a public use airport located one nautical mile (1.85 km) southeast of the central business district of Lake Placid, a village in the Town of North Elba, Essex County, New York, United States. It is owned by the North Elba Park District.

This airport is included in the FAA's National Plan of Integrated Airport Systems for 2019–2023, which categorized it as a general aviation facility. Currently, there is no scheduled air service to this airport, although charter operations are available at the airport.

Facilities and aircraft 
It has one runway designated 14/32 with an asphalt surface measuring 4,200 by 60 feet (1,280 x 18 m).

For the 12-month period ending July 18, 2019, the airport had 12,000 aircraft operations: 51% local general aviation, 34% itinerant general aviation, 14.5% air taxi, and 0.5% military. At that time there were 14 aircraft based at this airport: 12 single-engine and 2 multi-engine.

References

External links 
  airport diagram from New York State DOT
 Adirondack Flying Service / Lake Placid Airport
 Aerial image as of May 1995 from USGS The National Map
 
 

Airports in New York (state)
Transportation buildings and structures in Essex County, New York
Adirondacks